Kotoxó (Cotoxo, Kotosho; also Kutasho or Catethoy) is an extinct language closely related to Kamakã. It was one of the Macro-Jê languages spoken in Bahia, Brazil.

It was once spoken in an area roughly between the Pardo River and De Contas River.

References

Extinct languages of South America
Kamakã languages
Indigenous languages of Northeastern Brazil